José Murilo de Carvalho (born September 8, 1939) is a Brazilian historian. He obtained his PhD in political science from Stanford University, where he defended a thesis on the Brazilian Empire. He is professor emeritus at the Federal University of Rio de Janeiro. He also taught at the Federal University of Minas Gerais. He was a visiting professor and researcher at the universities of Oxford, Leiden, Stanford, California (Irvine), London, Notre Dame, at the Institute for Advanced Study in Princeton, New Jersey and at the Ortega y Gasset Foundation in Madrid.

He has published and organized 19 books and more than 100 articles in magazines. He is a member of the Brazilian Academy of Sciences and the Brazilian Academy of Letters, where he is the sixth occupant of Chair 5. He was elected to the Brazilian Academy of Letters on March 11, 2004, in succession to Rachel de Queiroz and received on September 10, 2004 by the academic Affonso Arinos de Mello Franco.

References

20th-century Brazilian historians
21st-century Brazilian historians
Academic staff of the Federal University of Rio de Janeiro